Russów  is a village in the administrative district of Gmina Żelazków, within Kalisz County, Greater Poland Voivodeship, in west-central Poland.

Notable people
Russów is the birthplace of writer Maria Dąbrowska (1889–1965), author of a popular Polish historical novel Noce i dnie (Nights and Days) written between 1932 and 1934. It was made into a film by the same title in 1975 by Jerzy Antczak. Her family belonged to local landed gentry (Ziemiaństwo).

References

Villages in Kalisz County